Alfred Kastler (3 May 1902 – 7 January 1984) was a French physicist, and Nobel Prize laureate.

Biography
Kastler was born in Guebwiller (Alsace, German Empire) and later attended the Lycée Bartholdi in Colmar, Alsace, and École Normale Supérieure in Paris in 1921. After his studies, in 1926 he began teaching physics at the Lycée of Mulhouse, and then taught at the University of Bordeaux, where he was a university professor until 1941. Georges Bruhat asked him to come back to the École Normale Supérieure, where he finally obtained a chair in 1952.

Collaborating with Jean Brossel, he researched quantum mechanics, the interaction between light and atoms, and spectroscopy. Kastler, working on combination of optical resonance and magnetic resonance, developed the technique of "optical pumping". Those works led to the completion of the theory of lasers and masers.

He won the Nobel Prize in Physics in 1966 "for the discovery and development of optical methods for studying Hertzian resonances in atoms".

He was president of the board of the Institut d'optique théorique et appliquée and served as the first chairman of the non-governmental organization (NGO) Action Against Hunger.

Kastler also wrote poetry (in German). In 1971 he published Europe, ma patrie: Deutsche Lieder eines französischen Europäers (i.e. Europe, my fatherland: German songs of a French European).

In 1976, Kastler was elected to the American Philosophical Society.

In 1978 he became foreign member of the Royal Netherlands Academy of Arts and Sciences.

In 1979, Kastler was awarded the Wilhelm Exner Medal.

Laboratoire Kastler-Brossel

Professor Kastler spent most of his research career at the Ecole Normale Supérieure in Paris where he started after the war with his student, Jean Brossel a small research group on spectroscopy.

Over the forty years that followed, this group has trained many of young physicists and had a significant impact on the development of the science of atomic physics in France. The Laboratoire de Spectroscopie hertzienne  has then been renamed Laboratoire Kastler-Brossel in 1994 and has got a part of its laboratory in Université Pierre et Marie Curie  mainly at the École Normale Supérieure.

Professor Kastler died on 7 January 1984, in Bandol, France.

See also
 Acoustic paramagnetic resonance

Notes

References

External links
  including the Nobel Lecture, December 12, 1966 Optical Methods for Studying Hertzian Resonances
 Alfred Kastler biography at Timeline of Nobel Winners
 

1902 births
1984 deaths
People from Guebwiller
French people of German descent
École Normale Supérieure alumni
Academic staff of the École Normale Supérieure
French physicists
German-language poets
Nobel laureates in Physics
French Nobel laureates
Spectroscopists
20th-century poets
Members of the French Academy of Sciences
Members of the Royal Netherlands Academy of Arts and Sciences
Members of the German Academy of Sciences at Berlin
Members of the American Philosophical Society
Presidents of the Société Française de Physique